Skybus may refer to:

Airlines
Skybus Airlines, a former American airline
SkyBus International Airlines, a Kazakh charter airline
Skybus (Aqua Avia), a proposed privately owned airline in New Zealand during the 1970s
Isles of Scilly Skybus, a British airline

Other transport
Skybus Metro, a defunct rapid transit proposal in India
SkyBus (airport bus), an airport bus service in Melbourne, Hobart and Gold Coast (Australia) and Auckland (New Zealand)
Sky Bus Transport System, intercity buses in Ethiopia
Transit Expressway Revenue Line, commonly known as "Skybus", a proposed people mover system in Pittsburgh, Pennsylvania

See also
Airbus